Pierre Garand (born 26 June 1972), known by his stage name Garou (a diminutive of his last name "Garand"), is a Canadian singer, actor, and entertainer from Sherbrooke, Québec. He sings in French and English, like his co-stars Daniel Lavoie and Bruno Pelletier.

He is known for his work in the musical Notre-Dame de Paris (playing Quasimodo in both the original French and English casts) and the No. 1 hits "Belle", "Seul", "Sous le vent", and "La Rivière de notre enfance".

Profile
Garou was born in Canada. Garou began playing the guitar at the age of three at the encouragement of his father (he also plays piano and trumpet). He went on to serve in the military and started a band in 1992 called the Untouchables. In 1997, he was discovered by Luc Plamondon while singing American blues tunes in a Sherbrooke bar. He was drafted by Plamondon to play the role of Quasimodo in his musical Notre-Dame de Paris, which made him a star in France and propelled his career into action. He would play the role of Quasimodo for 3 years. 

His first album Seul became the best-selling French album of 2001 and remains one of the best-selling French albums of all time, achieving 2 million sales in Europe and going three times platinum in Canada.

He continued his string of hits with a live album and his sophomore effort Reviens in 2003. Sales for his third album Garou remained strong and he released his English crossover Piece of My Soul in 2008. The album debuted at No. 2 in Canada and No. 3 in France. Despite this, the album became his first album in France not to reach platinum status although it became his best-selling album in North America in seven years. His next album, Gentleman cambrioleur features cover songs in French and English and became his first album to miss the top five in France, where it modestly peaked at No. 35, staying on the charts for 17 weeks. He released Version Intégrale in 2010 which became another Top 40 hit in France and Canada.

Garou performed the Jean-Pierre Ferland song "Un peu plus haut, un peu plus loin" (A Little Higher, A Little Farther) at the 2010 Winter Olympics opening ceremony in Vancouver, British Columbia. He has also performed at the charity event Les Enfoirés for the past 19 years.

In 2011, he was cast as the lead role Zark in the musical Zarkana at Cirque du Soleil in New York.

His latest effort Rhythm and Blues became his highest-peaking album in four years. It is his second covers album and pays tribute to classic R&B music.

He hosted the first two editions of Destination Eurovision, the selection show to choose the French entry for the Eurovision Song Contest, for France 2.

Collaborations

Garou has become well known for his collaborations. He has worked with Luc Plamondon in Notre-dame de Paris. The single "Belle" was lifted from the musical and stayed atop the French charts for a record-breaking 18 weeks. The single remained the most successful song in French history until 2009. In 2000, he had a successful duet with Celine Dion. "Sous le vent" became his third number one single in France. In 2004 he worked with Michel Sardou for his fourth and final No. 1 single, "La Rivière de notre enfance". The following year he appeared with 15-year-old singer Marilou on "Tu es comme ça."

He has also worked with several popular songwriters, including Jean-Jacques Goldman and Pascal Obispo. For his first album in English, Garou collaborated with some of the biggest names in music. The single "Stand Up" was written by Rob Thomas. He also sang the song "First Day of My Life", which was a big hit all over Europe in 2006 for former Spice Girl Melanie C, written by Guy Chambers and Enrique Iglesias.

Personal life

Born in the town of Sherbrooke, Quebec, Pierre "Garou" Garand was exposed to music from an early age. He began to learn guitar at the age of three and soon pursued other instruments; such as trumpet, piano and the organ. 

Garou has a daughter, Emelie (born July 7, 2001), with his ex-girlfriend, Ulrika, a former model. After they broke up he dated a former Yemeni singer and entertainer Arwa Jassem known as Lahlouba. From 2007 to June 2010 he dated French singer Lorie.

Garou is a member of the Les Enfoirés charity ensemble since 1999.

Discography 

 Seul (2000)
 Reviens (2003)
 Garou (2006)
 Piece of My Soul (2008)
 Gentleman cambrioleur (2009)
 Version intégrale (2010)
 Rhythm and Blues (2012)
 Au milieu de ma vie (2013)
 It's Magic (France) / Xmas Blues (Canada) (2014)
 Soul City (2019)
 Garou joue Dassin (2022)

See also

 List of Quebec musicians
 Music of Quebec
 Culture of Quebec

References

External links
 
 Biography of Garou, from Radio France Internationale

1972 births
Canadian male singers
Canadian male musical theatre actors
Canadian pop singers
French Quebecers
French-language singers of Canada
Living people
Musicians from Sherbrooke
Félix Award winners